HMS Nassau was a 64-gun third rate ship of the line of the Royal Navy, launched on 28 September 1785 by Hilhouse in Bristol.

One of her first ship's surgeons is thought to be John Sylvester Hay. He died young but he was the father of the actress Harriett Litchfield.

During the Nore Mutiny she was commanded by Captain Edward O'Bryen. She was converted for use as a troopship in 1797.

Nassau was wrecked on the Kicks sandbar off Texel, the Netherlands, on 14 October 1799, there being 205 survivors and about 100 lives lost.

Notes

References

 Lavery, Brian (2003) The Ship of the Line - Volume 1: The development of the battlefleet 1650-1850. Conway Maritime Press. .

External links
 

Ships of the line of the Royal Navy
Ardent-class ships of the line
Ships built in Bristol
1785 ships
Maritime incidents in 1799
Shipwrecks of the Netherlands
Shipwrecks in the North Sea